Gazaf may refer to:
 Gazaf-e Sofla